Henriette "Henni" Forchhammer, also known as Margarete Forchhammer (1863 – 1955) was a Danish educator, feminist and peace activist.

Biography
She was born in 1863 to Johannes Nicolai Georg Forchhammer, a sister of physicist and educator Johannes Georg Forchhammer and singer Viggo Forchhammer and aunt of theatre director Bjarne Forchhammer. She was a granddaughter of Johan Georg Forchhammer and grandniece of August Friedrich Wilhelm Forchhammer.

In 1899 she was a co-founder of Danske Kvinders Nationalråd, and she was also a board member from the start. She chaired the organization from 1913 to 1931. She also co-founded the Women's International League for Peace and Freedom in 1915, and was vice president of the International Council of Women from 1914 to 1930. From 1920 to 1937 she was a delegate to the League of Nations. 

She died in 1955.

See also
 List of peace activists

References

1863 births
1955 deaths
Danish feminists
Danish pacifists
Pacifist feminists
Women's International League for Peace and Freedom people